Yuriy Pakhlyayev (Cyrillic: Юрий Пахляев; born 20 December 1974) is a retired Kazakhstani athlete who specialised in the high jump. He represented his country at the 2000 Summer Olympics without qualifying for the final.

His personal bests in the event are 2.26 metres outdoors (Almaty 2000) and 2.27 metres indoors (Tashkent 1997).

Competition record

References

1974 births
Living people
Kazakhstani male high jumpers
Athletes (track and field) at the 2000 Summer Olympics
Olympic athletes of Kazakhstan
Athletes (track and field) at the 2002 Asian Games
Kazakhstani people of Russian descent
Asian Games competitors for Kazakhstan